The Jerome Stakes is a stakes race for thoroughbred horses run each January at Aqueduct Racetrack. Open to three year olds, the race is run at one mile and carries a purse of $150,000. It is a Road to the Kentucky Derby qualifying race, with the winner receiving 10 points towards qualification for the Kentucky Derby.

The Jerome is the second oldest stakes race in the United States behind the Travers Stakes. It is named after Leonard W. Jerome, the grandfather of Winston Churchill and the founder of the old Jerome Park Racetrack in The Bronx.

Notable horses that have won the Jerome include inaugural Kentucky Derby winner Aristides in 1875, Fitz Herbert in 1909, Bold Ruler in 1957, Kelso in 1960, Carry Back in 1961 and Fusaichi Pegasus in 2000.

Up until 2009 the race was typically held in the fall at Belmont Park, after the major three-year-old classics. Following a hiatus in 2010, the Jerome was run for two years at the end of the Aqueduct Spring meet in April before moving to its current position in early January.

The Jerome was first run at Jerome Park from 1866 to 1889, then at Morris Park Racecourse until 1905, at Belmont Park from 1906 to 1959 and 1968 to 2009, and also at Aqueduct Racetrack in 1960, from 1962 to 1967 and from 2011 to the present. There was no race run from 1910 to 1913 and there were two divisions from 1866 to 1870. Since inception it has been contested at a variety of distances:
 2 miles: 1871–1877
  miles: 1878–1889
  miles: 1890–1891, 1903
  miles: 1892
  miles: 1893–1894, 1896–1909
  miles: 1895
 1 mile, 70 yards: 2011-2017

Records
Speed record: (at current distance of one mile)
 1:33.20 – Noble Nashua (1981)
Most wins by a trainer:

 5 – Sam Hildreth (1908, 1909, 1914, 1919, 1922)

Most wins by a jockey:
 6 – Eddie Arcaro (1946, 1950, 1955, 1957, 1958, 1960)

Most wins by an owner:
 4 – Harry Payne Whitney (1906, 1907, 1921, 1926)
 4 – Joseph E. Widener (1927, 1930, 1933, 1940)

Winners

* † In 1977, To The Quick finished first but was disqualified and placed second and Affiliate who finished second was disqualified and placed third.

References

 The Jerome Stakes at the NYRA

Graded stakes races in the United States
Flat horse races for three-year-olds
Horse races in New York (state)
Aqueduct Racetrack
Recurring sporting events established in 1866
1866 establishments in New York (state)